Nordichallen is an indoor arena located in Sundsvall, Sweden. It opened in January 1992. It hosts football matches and concerts.

References

Football venues in Sweden
Sport in Sundsvall
Sports venues completed in 1992
GIF Sundsvall
1992 establishments in Sweden
Event venues in Sweden
Fairgrounds